ManageIQ is an open source cloud management platform. It was founded by Red Hat as a community project in 2014, and forms the basis for its CloudForms product. It allows centralized management of various virtualization, private cloud, public cloud, containers, and software defined networking technologies.

Features 

ManageIQ offers the following capabilities

 Self-service, allowing IT staff to present a catalog to users from which they can select automated services, such as provisioning a new virtual machine.
 Compliance enforcement, allowing an IT department to enforce certain compliance policies.
 Optimization, allowing IT staff to optimize the resource utilization of an environment, for example using right sizing and capacity planning.

Supported platforms 

ManageIQ can manage the following platforms:

Theory of operation 

ManageIQ is a manager of managers and as such, it needs to connect to other management systems to function. These other management systems are called providers in ManageIQ parlance. ManageIQ will connect to the providers via their API.

For each configured provider, ManageIQ will continuously discover inventory. The type of inventory depends on the provider, for example in the case of VMware vSphere it will be virtual machines, hypervisors, and other relevant elements. It will also discover relationships between the elements, for example, the fact that a virtual machine runs on a hypervisor, and listen for events. Certain events that indicate a change in the environment will result in a full or partial refresh of the inventory. The end result is a mirror of the inventory that is nearly instantaneously up to date with respect to the original inventory managed by the provider.

If configured to do so, ManageIQ will also capture metrics like CPU and memory usage on the discovered inventory.

All captured information about a managed environment is stored in a database called the Virtual Management Database (VMDB). As of March 2016, the VMDB schema described in excess of 200 entities and relationships.

Architecture 

ManageIQ is written in the Ruby (programming language) language and uses the Ruby on Rails framework. The ManageIQ software is shipped as a pre-built virtual appliance, roughly 1GB in size. The appliance is based on the CentOS operating system, and includes an embedded PostgreSQL database. Since the Darga release, a container-based version has also been made available.  In the Jansa release, a modified version was built that can run on Kubernetes and OpenShift.

An appliance can be used on its own, or it can be part of a distributed architecture. In this case the administrator would configure zones, regions, and a single global region. Appliances can be assigned to a specific zone or region, and are configured with specific roles so that work is coordinated with the region. Most roles are multi-server and work is distributed automatically via a queue, but some roles like the database are singletons. Appliance roles can also be configured for failover in order to provide high availability.

Releases 

The ManageIQ project uses a time based release cycle where a new version is released approximately every 6 months.

Releases are named after chess grandmasters, where subsequent releases names start with consecutive letters of the alphabet. The following versions have been released so far:

History 

The ManageIQ code base was originally developed by ManageIQ, Inc., from 2006 onwards. The product was first launched as Enterprise Virtualization Manager (EVM) Suite in 2007. Over the next 5 years ManageIQ steadily improved the product and got more customers. ManageIQ, Inc. was named Gartner Cool Vendor in 2008.

In December 2012, Red Hat announced that it had entered into a definitive agreement to acquire ManageIQ, Inc. After the acquisition, Red Hat released the ManageIQ, Inc. code under the CloudForms product name, where it replaced the previous implementation based on the Deltacloud and Aeolus projects. The first publicly available release was CloudForms 3.0, released in late 2013. In June 2014, Red Hat open sourced the code base under the project name ManageIQ, and founded the ManageIQ project to steward its ongoing development as an open source community.

External links 
 Official website

References 

Red Hat software